Richland Township is a civil township of Saginaw County in the U.S. state of Michigan. The 2010 Census placed the population at 4,144, which is a decrease from the 4,281 residents recorded at the 2000 Census.

Communities
 Hemlock is an unincorporated community and census-designated place of at the center of the township and holds the township offices.
 Iva is an unincorporated community at Dice and Iva Road. A post office operated from December 7, 1894, until October 14, 1904.

Geography

Demographics
As of the census of 2000, there were 4,281 people, 1,567 households, and 1,220 families residing in the township. The racial makeup of the township was 98.22% White, 0.07% African American, 0.23% Native American, 0.21% Asian, 0.79% from other races, and 0.47% from two or more races. Hispanic or Latino of any race were 1.96% of the population.

There were 1,567 households, out of which 37.1% had children under the age of 18 living with them, 63.8% were married couples living together, 10.1% had a female householder with no husband present, and 22.1% were non-families. 19.2% of all households were made up of individuals, and 7.8% had someone living alone who was 65 years of age or older.  The average household size was 2.72 and the average family size was 3.10.

In the township the population was spread out, with 27.8% under the age of 18, 7.2% from 18 to 24, 29.1% from 25 to 44, 24.2% from 45 to 64, and 11.7% who were 65 years of age or older.  The median age was 36 years. For every 100 females, there were 95.7 males.  For every 100 females age 18 and over, there were 91.0 males.

The median income for a household in the township was $45,580, and the median income for a family was $51,304. Males had a median income of $41,556 versus $24,351 for females. The per capita income for the township was $19,362.  About 5.3% of families and 5.9% of the population were below the poverty line, including 5.4% of those under age 18 and 5.1% of those age 65 or over.

References

External links
Richland Township

Townships in Saginaw County, Michigan
Townships in Michigan